Eupithecia retusa is a moth in the family Geometridae. It is found in Libya.

References

Moths described in 1939
retusa
Moths of Africa